Isak Konon Wombon or Isak Konon (born 15 February 1986 in Merauke, Papua) is an Indonesian football defender who can operate as a winger as well. He currently plays for Persiwa Wamena.

References

External links
Profile Isak Konon Wombon at Liga-Indonesia.co.id

Indonesian footballers
1986 births
Living people
Liga 1 (Indonesia) players
People from Merauke Regency
Persiter Ternate players
Persiwa Wamena players
Indonesian Premier Division players
Association football fullbacks
Association football wingers
Sportspeople from Papua